När karusellerna sover ("When the carousels are sleeping") was the Sveriges Television's Christmas calendar in 1998. The screenplay was written by Hans Alfredsson.

Plot 
One day after school, Jack meets a dog leading him through an entrance leading to an amusement park, closed over winter. The dog runs through the entrance, followed by Jack.

Video 
The series was released to VHS in 1999 and DVD in 2006. The soundtrack music was released to CD in 1998 by the Independent Entertainment record label.

References

External links 
 

1998 Swedish television series debuts
1998 Swedish television series endings
Sveriges Television's Christmas calendar
Television shows set in Sweden